Taman Pintar Yogyakarta, or just Taman Pintar, is a science-themed park and museum for kids and a place for expression, appreciation, creation in a pleasant situation. It is situated on the center of the city of Yogyakarta, on Jalan Panembahan Senopati.

Bringing its motto educate and pleasant, the place that was firstly built in 2004 wants to increase the intention of kids and the young generation in science through imaginations, trials, and games in order to improve the human resources.

Taman Pintar also concerns in implement Ki Hajar Dewantara's lessons of Niteni (to understand), Niroake (to follow), and Nambahi (to improve).

Zone 
Playground
A place to welcome and play and also a public place for the visitors. Here, there are places for children to play such as Talking Pipe, Whispering Parabola, Tree House, Dancing Water, Water Corridor, Pulley System, Moving Bridge, Sand Palace, etc.

Heritage Building
This area are intended for the kids pre-school and.

Oval Building:
This area consists of the zone of environmental introduction and science exhibition, history, science and technology.

Square Building:
It consists of three floors. The first is exhibition room, audio visual room, food court, and souvenir counter. The second floor is elementary material and implementing science, and library. The third floor is science laboratory, animation and TV, and courses class.

Planetarium

Open Hour 
Everyday from Tuesday to Sunday at 09.00 - 16.00 PM (Monday closed)

Facility 
Interactive science materials
Exhibition Room and audiovisual room
Food court
Small Mosque
Souvenir shop
Information center

2004 establishments in Indonesia
Tourist attractions in Yogyakarta